Legislative Assembly elections are scheduled to be held in Karnataka before May 2023 to elect all 224 members of the Karnataka Legislative Assembly.

Background 
The tenure of Karnataka Legislative Assembly is scheduled to end on 24 May 2023. The previous assembly elections were held in May 2018. After the election, coalition of Janata Dal (Secular) and Indian National Congress formed the state government, with H. D. Kumaraswamy becoming Chief Minister.

Political developments 

In July 2019, the coalition government collapsed due to resignations by several members of INC and JD(S) in the assembly. Subsequently, Bharatiya Janata Party formed the state government, with B. S. Yediyurappa becoming Chief Minister.

On 26 July 2021, Yediyurappa resigned from Chief Minister's post and Basavaraj Bommai was sworn in as the new Chief Minister on 28 July 2021.

On 19 February 2023, BJP leader H.D. Thammaiah joined Congress along with his supporters. On 9 March 2023, BJP MLC Puttanna joined INC giving another shock to BJP.

Schedule

Voting

Voter statistics
5.21 crore people, including 2.59 women, are registered to vote. 16,976 centenarians, 4,699 transgender voters, and 9.17 lakh first-time voters are also included in the total. Moreover, 5.55 lakh voters are disabled and 12.15 lakh voters are over the age of 80. (PWD). "The ECI will offer the facilities to those above the age of 80 for the first time.

polling stations
The state has 58,272 polling stations, including 24,063 in urban areas. Of these, 1,320 are women managed, 224 are youth managed and 224 are PWD managed. There will be webcasting in 29,141 polling stations, and 1,200 are critical. Most of the polling stations are in schools, which will have permanent water, electricity, toilet and ramps. This is a gift from the ECI to the schools and to the school children.

Voter data scam
The National Congress made allegations that an NGO in Bengaluru had amassed voter personal data, including caste, age, gender, work and education information, Aadhar cards, phone numbers, and more.

Issues

Belagavi border dispute 
Tensions concerning the Belagavi border dispute intensified in early December 2022 as a delegation of Maharashtra politicians proposed to travel to Belagavi district to demand the merger of some villages in Karnataka with Maharashtra, with politicians from Maharashtra making provocative statements. The border row escalated into violence after vehicles from both states were attacked and damaged in Belgaon and Pune in mid-December.

No survey or media reports have indicated yet, if it is going to be a significant election issue. Former Union Minister, and Vijayapura MP Ramesh Jigajinagi said that Maharashtra's political leaders are in sleepy mood all the time, but whenever the elections come, they try to create a political conspiracy by raking up the border dispute in Karnataka.

Corruption 
In July 2021, D. Kempanna, president of the Karnataka State Contractors' Association wrote to Prime Minister Narendra Modi alleging large-scale corruption in the award and implementation of civil contracts in Karnataka. In the letter, he alleged that contractors were being forced to pay a 40% commission to officials at the BJP government, cutting across departments, for projects.

Contractor Santhosh Patil (aged 40) who accused then-state cabinet minister K. S. Eshwarappa of harassing him for commissions committed suicide at Shambhavi Hotel in Udupi on 12 April 2022. He alleged that the BJP leader had been harassing him for commissions to clear the bills for contracts he had implemented for the government over a year ago. Eshwarappa had to resign as cabinet minister following the incident.

In August 2022, two associations representing 13,000 schools in Karnataka wrote to Prime Minister Narendra Modi accusing the Basavaraj Bommai-led BJP government of corruption. "Unscientific, irrational, discriminatory and noncompliance norms are applied to only unaided private schools and huge corruption is in place," the letter read. The school associations urged PM Modi to look into the allegations and launch an inquiry into the affairs of the Karnataka education ministry.

In order to "expose" the ruling BJP in Karnataka, the opposition Congress party has determined to make the Bitcoin scam an election issue in the 2023 elections.

When the merchandise was exported via Goa, depriving Karnataka of its tax revenue, the state exchequer lost roughly Rs 60 crore while the excise scam cost about Rs 200 crore, according to Priyank Kharge.

Communal Tensions
According to political analysts Phani Rajanna and Sandeep Shastri, with Karnataka polls nearing, the BJP is raking up more and more communal issues to divide people and polarise the votes. This has been shown by communal tensions started by right-wing Hindutva groups on hijab, halal, azan, boycott of Muslim-run shops, and moral policing of Muslims and Christians, which have been linked to the Bommai government.

The BJP has focused its campaign around communal issues, drawing stark criticism from the opposition Congress, which accused it of neglecting governance issues.

Reservation controversy
The BJP is preparing for a fight in the Karnataka elections. Caste politics have once again risen to the forefront following the just completed elections in five states. The tone for the assembly elections the next year is being set by the regrouping of various caste lobbies in their fight for reservation.

Farm laws
While various caste groups are working to make the controversial farm rules that the government passed two years ago the main topic for the forthcoming assembly elections, farmer organisations are getting ready to resurrect the issue.

Parties and alliances









Others

Candidates 
JD(S) released the first list of 93 candidates on 19 December 2022.

Aam Aadami Party released the first list of 80 candidates on 20 march 2023

Campaigns

Bharatiya Janata Party 
Karnataka chief minister Basavaraj Bommai and former chief minister B. S. Yediyurappa started the "Jana Sankalpa Yatra" for the Bharatiya Janata Party on 11 October 2022, coinciding with the Bharat Jodo Yatra of Congress' Rahul Gandhi in the state. The yatra would cover 52 assembly constituencies.

On 3 January 2023, BJP Karnataka state president Nalin Kumar Kateel in a party meet at Mangalore said that people should prioritise the issue of "love jihad" over "road, gutter, drain and other small issues". Several state BJP leaders expressed unhappiness over the remarks and felt that it would not help the party cause.

Indian National Congress 
The Indian National Congress kickstarted its campaign with the entry of the Bharat Jodo Yatra in Karnataka on 30 September 2022. The yatra had huge crowds throughout the state, galvanising the party cadre and increasing morale of party workers, according to political experts. Police started cracking down on Congress' PayCM campaign against the alleged corruption in the Bommai ministry upon the entry of the Bharat Jodo Yatra. In the yatra, Rahul Gandhi stressed issues such as the handling of the COVID-19 pandemic by the state BJP government and the importance of regional languages, especially Kannada.

In September 2022, the Congress set up QR codes of "PayCM" in many parts of Bengaluru. These posters had Karnataka CM Basavaraj Bommai's dotted face with the caption "40% Accepted Here...Scan this QR code to make CM PAY for Corruption" as a knockoff of the QR code of Paytm. These posters referred to the allegations that Bommai's BJP government took bribes in awarding public contracts and recruitments. These QR codes took scanners to a website people could report corruption and make complains at a designated website.

Manifesto
A 10-point platform for the Coastal region was released by the Congress Party for the Assembly elections. It focuses on generating employment, luring capital, growing tourism, and fostering social peace.

Janata Dal (Secular) 
The Janata Dal (Secular) kickstarted the Pancharatna Yatra in Mulabagilu on 1 November 2022. A road campaign across the Old Mysore region, it has been witnessing a huge turnout in the southern region of the state.

Polls

Opinion polls

Results

Result by Party

Results by division

Results by district

Results by constituency

See also 
2023 elections in India
Elections in Karnataka
 Caste politics in Karnataka 
 
 Operation Kamala in Karnataka
 2019 Karnataka political crisis

Further reading
 Karnataka Government and Politics
 Karnataka Assembly_Factbook

External links
 #KarnatakaElection2023
 CHIEF ELECTORAL OFFICER KARNATAKA, Government of Karnataka

References

State Assembly elections in Karnataka
K
2023 State Assembly elections in India